The Fred Gottschalk Grocery Store is a historic grocery store building located at 301 West Edwards Street in Springfield, Illinois. Fred Gottschalk opened his first store at the site in 1887; he built the present building in 1898. The brick building has a Commercial style design with a cast iron storefront and a corbelled cornice. The store, one of several groceries in the area, served many of Springfield's prominent politicians and their families; it also allowed its customers to purchase goods by telephone. Gottschalk and his son Arthur ran the store until 1971; the building is now one of the few surviving neighborhood groceries in Springfield.

The store was added to the National Register of Historic Places on March 18, 1985.

References

Commercial buildings on the National Register of Historic Places in Illinois
Commercial architecture in Illinois
Commercial buildings completed in 1898
National Register of Historic Places in Springfield, Illinois
Buildings and structures in Springfield, Illinois
1898 establishments in Illinois
Grocery store buildings